D. Narottam (born 29 August 1922, date of death unknown) was an Indian cricketer. He played in 27 first-class matches between 1943 and 1960. He took a hat-trick in the 1947–48 Ranji Trophy playing for Kathiawar against Baroda. Narottam is deceased.

See also
 List of hat-tricks in the Ranji Trophy

References

External links
 

1922 births
Year of death missing
Indian cricketers
Saurashtra cricketers
Sindh cricketers
Sportspeople from Sindh